KSMM-FM (101.5 MHz) is a radio station licensed to serve the community of Liberal, Kansas, United States. The station is owned by Rocking M Media, LLC. It airs a Regional Mexican music format.

The station was assigned the call sign KSLS by the Federal Communications Commission on April 10, 1978. In the 1980s, under that call sign, it was part of the "LS Network" of Kansas radio entrepreneur Larry Steckline. The station changed its call sign to KSMM-FM on February 15, 2008.

References

External links
Official website

SMM-FM
Regional Mexican radio stations in the United States
Radio stations established in 1979
1979 establishments in Kansas
Seward County, Kansas